Igor Vladimirovich Degtyaryov (born 22 August 1976) is a Russian professional football official and a former player. He is the general director of FC Orenburg.

As a player, he made his professional debut in the Russian Second Division in 1993 for FC Gazovik Orenburg.

References

1976 births
People from Orenburg
Living people
Russian footballers
Russian Premier League players
FC KAMAZ Naberezhnye Chelny players
FC Fakel Voronezh players
Association football midfielders
FC Orenburg players
Sportspeople from Orenburg Oblast